Rebecca Sara Newton  is an American actress, known for her roles as Amanda Tanen on Ugly Betty and Quinn Garvey on How I Met Your Mother.

Early life
Newton was born in New Haven, Connecticut, the daughter of Thomas Newton and Jennifer Newton (née Chase), daughter of composer and arranger Bruce Chase and violinist Fannie (née Paschell) Chase. Newton is a first cousin once removed of actress Sienna Miller. 

After graduation, Newton then moved to New York City and landed several roles in television commercials for such companies as the Olive Garden. Newton also appeared in a PSA video about the dangers of drinking for Human Relations Media, called "Keg Party."

Career
Newton portrayed the character Amanda Tanen in the ABC comedy-drama series Ugly Betty from 2006 to 2010. With co-star Michael Urie, Newton co-hosted the official Ugly Betty podcast. She also starred in ABC.com's web series Mode After Hours opposite Urie. Ugly Betty was cancelled in 2010 after four seasons.

In late 2009, Newton performed at a New York City Center Encores! presentation of the Gershwin musical Girl Crazy, which was directed by Jerry Zaks. She portrayed Molly Gray and performed opposite real-life husband Chris Diamantopoulos.

Newton starred in the television series Love Bites in 2011. The hour-long romantic comedy was created by executive producer Cindy Chupack, who worked on Sex and the City. NBC announced the pick up of the series in May 2010. However, with Newton announcing her pregnancy, co-star Jordana Spiro contractually obligated to stay with her other show, My Boys (which was later cancelled), and Chupack's desire to leave the show, Love Bites was pushed back to midseason. Love Bites was ultimately aired in July 2011 on NBC and was cancelled after its first-season order of episodes was burned off. In November 2011, Newton was cast on CBS's How I Met Your Mother as Quinn Garvey, a love interest for Neil Patrick Harris's character Barney Stinson where she played a stripper. In 2013, Newton starred in the midseason Fox comedy series The Goodwin Games. In 2018 Newton began appearing in a recurring role on the HBO  TV series Divorce, playing Jackie Giannopolis, the new girlfriend of Thomas Haden Church's character.

On September 13, 2019, it was announced that Newton will once again team up with Urie on a sitcom project for CBS and Warner Bros. Television called Fun, for which both will co-star and co-executive produce with creator Michael Patrick King and fellow Ugly Betty showrunners Tracy Poust and Jon Kinnally. However, the pilot is not moving forward.

On February 2, 2021, it was announced that Newton has replaced Kiele Sanchez as Lorna Taylor, Mickey Haller's second ex-wife and office manager, in the upcoming Netflix-ordered series The Lincoln Lawyer,  with Manuel Garcia-Rulfo replacing Logan Marshall-Green as Mickey Haller.

Personal life
Newton met her husband, actor Chris Diamantopoulos, in a subway station in New York and they married on May 12, 2005. It was announced on July 1, 2010 that Newton and Diamantopoulos were expecting their first child. She gave birth to a son in early November 2010 and a daughter in early 2014. Newton gave birth to another daughter in 2020.

Her older brother, Matt Newton, is also an actor. He played the recurring role of Marc St. James' boyfriend Troy in the fourth and final season of Ugly Betty. Her mother, Jennifer, is an artist, and her aunt, Stephanie Chase, is a classical violinist.

Filmography

Film

Television

Web

Awards and nominations

References

External links

 

21st-century American actresses
Actresses from New Haven, Connecticut
American film actresses
American television actresses
Living people
University of Pennsylvania alumni
Year of birth missing (living people)